The IBM System/360 Model 40 was a mid-range member of the IBM System/360 family.  It was announced on April 7, 1964, shipped in 1965, and withdrawn on October 7, 1977.

History
On April 7, 1964, IBM announced the IBM System/360, to be available in six models. The 360/40 was first delivered in April 1965.

The 360/30 and the 360/40 were the two largest revenue producing System/360 models, accounting for over half of the units sold.

Models
Five models of the 360/40 were offered. The D40, E40, F40, G40 and H40 were configured with 16K, 32K, 64K, 128K and 256K of core memory and correspondingly 16, 32, 64, 128 and 128  multiplexer subchannels.

The H40 occupied "more floor space than the other models."

Configuration

Microprogramming

Like most System/360 models the Model 40 was microprogrammed. The microcode was stored in transformer read-only storage (TROS), organized as up to 8192 words of 56 bits each. Standard microcode consisted of up to 4096 words. The additional 4096 words were used for the 1401 or 1410 compatibility feature.

IBM 1400 series emulation
With the additional Compatibility Feature hardware and Compatibility Support software under DOS/360, the IBM 1401/1440/1460 object programs could be run in the emulation mode, with little or no reprogramming.

Other
Although the cover of IBM's MVT Guide indicates that even a 360/40 could run MVT,
the IBM operating system used was usually the realistically sized DOS/360, because all but one model of the 360/40 had less than MVT's minimum memory requirements of 256KB.

The IBM System/360 Model 40 was developed at IBM Hursley and manufactured at IBM's facilities in: Poughkeepsie, U.S., Mainz, Germany; and Fujisawa, Japan.

A modified Model 40 ran CP-40, the ancestor of CP/CMS, which in turn was the progenitor of the VM line.

Notes

References

System 360 Model 40